Aumeville-Lestre is a commune in the Manche department in the Normandy region in northwestern France.

Population

See also
Communes of the Manche department

References

Communes of Manche